The English Football League play-offs for the 2019–20 season (referred to as the Sky Bet Play-Offs for sponsorship reasons) were held in June, July and August 2020 with all finals played at Wembley Stadium in London. The play-offs began in each league with two semi-finals played over two legs. The teams who finished in 3rd, 4th, 5th, and 6th place in the Championship and League One and the 4th, 5th, 6th, and 7th-placed teams in League Two were set to compete. The winners of the semi-finals advanced to the finals, with the winner of the final gaining promotion for the following season.

The away goals rule does not apply in the playoff semi-finals per the standard rules.

Background 
The English Football League play-offs have been held every year since 1987. They take place for each division following the conclusion of the regular season and are contested by the four clubs finishing below the automatic promotion places. The fixtures are determined by final league position – in the Championship and League One this is 3rd v 6th and 4th v 5th, while in League Two it is 4th v 7th and 5th v 6th.

Championship 
The matchups were determined on 22 July 2020 on the conclusion of the league season.

First leg

Second leg
Brentford won 3–2 on aggregate
Fulham won 3–2 on aggregate

Championship final

League One 

After suspending play due to the COVID-19 pandemic in the United Kingdom, EFL League One clubs voted to curtail the season, and using points per game (PPG) to decide the final standings.

League One semi-finals 
First leg

Second leg

2–2 on aggregate, Oxford United won 5–4 on penalties.

Wycombe Wanderers won 6–3 on aggregate.

League One final

League Two 
After suspending play due to the COVID-19 pandemic in the United Kingdom, EFL League Two clubs voted to curtail the season, and using points per game (PPG) to decide the final standings.

League Two semi-finals 
 First leg

 
Second leg

Exeter City won 3–2 on aggregate.

Northampton Town won 3–2 on aggregate.

League Two final

Notes

References

 
Play-offs
English Football League play-offs